The 1973 Canadian-American Challenge Cup was the eighth season of the Can-Am auto racing series.  It consisted of FIA Group 7 racing cars running two-hour sprint events.  It began June 10, 1973, and ended October 28, 1973, after eight rounds. The season came amid the Oil Crisis, which ended interest in performance cars after an already-declining market over a several-year period. The golden age of the Trans Am Series ended after the 1972 season, leaving Can Am and Formula 5000 as the frontrunners of the SCCA. The season was also the penultimate season of the series, which would fold after 1974 before being revived in an entirely reworked series based on F5000 a few years later.

Schedule
For 1973, the schedule was altered as the season continued on.  The first race ran in a standard, single race format.  Rounds two through four ran as two heats, with the results being determined by combined results.  Rounds five through eight ran a Sprint qualifying heat first to determine the starting order for the Cup event.  The results of the Sprint and Cup were not combined.

Season results

Drivers Championship
Points are awarded to the top ten finishers in the order of 20-15-12-10-8-6-4-3-2-1.

References

 
 

 
Can-Am seasons
Can-Am